Louis Le Chatelier (20 February 1815 – 10 November 1873) was a French chemist and industrialist who developed a method for producing aluminium from bauxite in 1855. His son was chemist Henry Louis Le Chatelier. His name is inscribed on the Eiffel tower.

Le Chatelier and his wife Louise Madeleine Élisabeth Durand (1827–1902) had seven children.
One was Alfred Le Chatelier (1855–1929), who joined the army.
Alfred later became a ceramicist and then held the chair of Muslim sociology in the Collège de France for many years.

References

Sources

École Polytechnique alumni
Mines Paris - PSL alumni
Corps des mines
19th-century French chemists
1815 births
1873 deaths
Scientists from Paris